Mercury-P is a mission concept for an orbiter and lander by the Russian Federal Space Agency to study the planet Mercury. The initial study suggested a launch in 2024,  but because of crash of the Phobos-Grunt spacecraft, the implementation period was  postponed to the 2030s.  The letter P in Mercury-P, stands for the Russian word 'posadka', meaning landing.

Mercury-P would be the first soft lander on Mercury. A proposed flight scenario for the mission included a flyby of Venus, the insertion of the spacecraft into the orbit around Mercury and the delivery of a lander on its surface. The Institute of Space Research studied the possibility of "recycling" hardware developed for the Phobos-Grunt, Mars-NET, Mars-96, and Solar Sail spacecraft, with proposed upgrades of the hardware.  , Russian scientists have conducted a preliminary concept study of the project, and compiled a list of the required scientific payload.

References

Russian space probes
Missions to Mercury
Proposed space probes